

References

Former buildings and structures in Belgium
Transport in Belgium
 
Belgium